Norman Leslie Shelton,  (28 June 1905 – 14 July 1980) was a New Zealand politician of the National Party.

Biography

Early life and career
Shelton was born on 27 June 1905 in Taihape and was subsequently educated at Fielding Technical School. He then entered the employment of Hodder and Tolley Ltd in 1920 as a salesman. In 1934 he was appointed manager of the company's Marton branch which he held until 1954 when he resigned. In 1935 he married Dorothy Mamie Stevens. He was interested in music and sung baritone. He was actively involved with the Marton Players and Marton Music Society.

During World War II he was an artillery gunner and posted to the Pacific, Egypt and Italy from 1943 to 1944.

After returning from the war Shelton was president and treasurer of the Marton A & P Association as well as secretary of the Rangitikei Potato Growers Association. He was an advisory member of the Marton Young Farmers, patron of the Marton Scouts and Venturers club and a member of the Marton Jockey and Racing Club.

Political career

He was a member of the National Party and was chairman of the party's Rangitikei electorate committee from 1951 until 1954. He then represented the Rangitikei electorate from 1954 to 1972, when he retired.

He was a Cabinet Minister, including Minister of Health and Minister of Minister of Social Security 1960–1962; Minister of Customs, 1962–1969; Minister of Industries and Commerce, and Minister of Mines, 1969–1972. Deputy Prime Minister Jack Marshall was convinced of Shelton's administrative ability and ensured Holyoake gave him a place in cabinet.

In December 1967 Shelton and his wife were in a road accident. Their car collided with a car towing a boat just south of the Manawatu River bridge at Foxton causing it to fall down a 40 foot bank. Both of Shelton's legs were broken, including comprehensive damage to ligaments and kneecaps. His wife suffered cuts and bruising while the three people in the other vehicle were unharmed despite their vehicle being overturned. He was taken to Palmerston North Hospital for recovery. He was there for several months and occupied his time doing his ministerial paperwork, contrasting with expectations that he would resign.

He was described by contemporaries as the best minister in the Holyoake cabinet. He was ranked third in the cabinet and was Acting prime minister on several occasions. A man of undoubted ability, he lacked the charisma and ambition to pursue the leadership of the party and by 1970 he was suffering ill-health due to a gall bladder ailment which induced him to retire.

Later life and death
After retiring he was a newspaper music critic in Wanganui. In the 1973 Queen's Birthday Honours, Shelton was appointed a Commander of the Order of the British Empire, for public services.

He died in Wellington Hospital in 1980, aged 75 years, after suffering from a heart complaint. He was survived by his wife Dorothy and son Lindsay. Lindsay was married to famous broadcaster Sharon Crosbie.

Notes

References

1905 births
1980 deaths
New Zealand military personnel of World War II
New Zealand National Party MPs
Members of the Cabinet of New Zealand
New Zealand MPs for North Island electorates
Members of the New Zealand House of Representatives
New Zealand Commanders of the Order of the British Empire
20th-century New Zealand politicians